"Summer Samba" (also known as "So Nice" or its original Portuguese title, "Samba de Verão") is a 1964 bossa nova and jazz standard song by Brazilian composer Marcos Valle, with English-language lyrics by Norman Gimbel; the original Portuguese lyrics are by Paulo Sérgio Valle, the composer's brother.

Walter Wanderley Trio

The song was first popularized by the Walter Wanderley Trio in 1966 — the album Rain Forest on which it was issued reached platinum status in 1970 — Allmusic has said of Wanderley's version, "His recording ... is regarded as perhaps a more definitive bossa tune than "Girl From Ipanema." In 1966, Wanderley's version was the biggest seller in the U.S., reaching #26 on the Billboard Hot 100 and #3 on the Easy Listening chart. The composition is still a favourite on Adult Standards radio stations.

Covers
On the U.S. "Easy Listening" chart, there were versions by Johnny Mathis, Vikki Carr, and Connie Francis during that same year. In fact, at least one source claims that three different versions were on the Billboard charts at the same time in 1966. 
Andy Williams released a version in 1966 on his album, In the Arms of Love. The Angels released a version of the song in 1967 entitled "So Nice" as the B-side to their "Merry Go Round". Other notable versions include those by Astrud Gilberto and by Bebel Gilberto, both of which have been used in several television programs and in widely broadcast TV advertisements. A slower version was put out by Brasil '65 with Wanda de Sah and Sergio Mendes. As of 2000, the song had been recorded by more than 180 different artists worldwide.
The song was covered by Emma Bunton in 2004 and was released as a b-side on the commercial CD single to her single "Crickets Sing For Anamaria" (also written by Marcos Valle), taken from her critically acclaimed second album, Free Me. This song features the Hammond B-3 organ, a staple of the sixties in the recording studio.
The song appears in the film Austin Powers: The Spy Who Shagged Me as well as Click. It also is a major theme in the game Destroy All Humans!, largely as an intentional music joke when the player idles for over five minutes, as the video game is set in 1959, five years before the song's release. 
A cover by Thai singer Nadia appears in the 2002 film Blissfully Yours.
It is said that the music from the video game called StreetPass Mii Plaza for Nintendo 3DS strongly resembles "Summer Samba".
Eliane Elias included the song in her 2004 album Dreamer.

See also
List of bossa nova standards

Notes

External links

Duet of Marcos Valle with Patricia Marx singing "Samba de Verão in the original Portuguese (retrieved 8 May 2008)

Songs with music by Marcos Valle
Songs with lyrics by Norman Gimbel
1964 songs
1966 singles
1960s jazz standards
Bossa nova songs
English-language Brazilian songs
Connie Francis songs
Andy Williams songs
The Angels (American group) songs